Ralf Diegel (born 1 December 1963) is a German swimmer. He competed in two events at the 1984 Summer Olympics for West Germany.

References

External links
 

1963 births
Living people
German male swimmers
Olympic swimmers of West Germany
Swimmers at the 1984 Summer Olympics
People from Frechen
Sportspeople from Cologne (region)